Doug Scott (born 1960) served one term from 2001 to 2005 as mayor of Rockford, Illinois, United States, after serving from 1995 to 2001 as a member of the Illinois General Assembly. He was elected mayor after Charles Box declined to seek another term. A Democrat, Scott was appointed to head the Illinois Environmental Protection Agency after losing his mayoral reelection bid in 2005.  Scott served as chairman of the Illinois Commerce Commission from 2011 to 2015.

Scott is most well known for his work to clean up and maintain the environment.  He implemented Rockford's citywide recycling program along with a program to collect used animal fats, engine oil and hazardous waste.  Scott also is a member of the Illinois Brownfields Association and served as president from 2003 to 2005.

References

Mayors of Rockford, Illinois
Living people
1960 births